From the Corner to the Block is the fifth studio album by the New Orleans-based jazz fusion/funk group Galactic. Unlike the group's other albums, From the Corner to the Block is a collaboration with various alternative hip hop musicians.  It was produced by Count, Ben Ellman and Galactic.

Track listing
"What You Need" - (with Lyrics Born)
"...And I'm Out" - (with Mr. Lif)
"The Corner" - (with Gift of Gab)
"Second and Dryades" - (with Big Chief Monk Boudreaux)
"Think Back" - (with Chali 2na)
"Bounce Baby" - (with DJ Z-Trip)
"Hustle Up" - (with Boots Riley)
"Sidewalk Stepper"
"From the Corner to the Block" - (with Juvenile / Soul Rebels Brass Band)
"Squarebiz" - (with Ladybug Mecca / Nino Moschella)
"Tuff Love" - (with Trombone Shorty)
"No Way" - (with Lateef the Truthspeaker)
"Fanfare"
"Find My Home" - (with Ohmega Watts / Vursatyl)

External links
 band website
 Anti- catalog page

2007 albums
Galactic albums
Anti- (record label) albums